Herbs de Majorca (Catalan: Herbes de Mallorca; Spanish: Hierbas Mallorquinas) is a Majorcan herbal liqueur of medicinal origin. A form of the generic Hierbas, Herbs de Majorca has a protected designation of origin and can only be made in Majorca.

A common brand is 'Tunel', first produced in 1898.

Origins 
The Herbs of Majorca have a medical origin. Produced in monasteries, it was used by pharmacists in the 16th century to fight diseases. Herbal liquor, distilled with several herbs, seeds, roots and flowers already being used for medical purposes, was recognised for its digestive effects, was used particularly to help stomach ailments. In the 18th century, an annual production of 780 000 litres was recorded in Mallorca.

Composition 
Made from anise and other aromatic plants such as camomile, fennel, lemon, lemon verbena, marjoram, mint, orange, and rosemary.

This liqueur, which has a protected geographic denomination of origin, is produced and bottled only on the island. Depending on the sugar and alcohol content, three types are produced: sweet, mixed or dry; the first are made with more sugared anise, while the dry variant contains more alcohol. In terms of consumption, the liqueur can be enjoyed pure or with ice.

Herbs of Mallorca is commercially produced but can also be made at home. Mallorcan families have their own recipes, adjusted to personal taste. Traditionally prepared in either spring or early autumn, the herbs and alcohol are combined in a large glass bottle and must be left for a minimum of three months before consumption.

Serving 
Green or amber in colour, it is usually served as a digestif, after a meal. It is often served over ice, but can also be served in a ‘chupito’ (a shot glass). Some bottles have a dried piece of a plant in them.[1] Hierbas is still a popular drink today in the Balearic Islands and is enjoyed by both locals and tourists. A potent drink, it should be enjoyed in moderation!

References 

Spanish distilled drinks
Herbal liqueurs
Culture of Mallorca
Spanish products with protected designation of origin